Hare Bay may refer to:

 Hare Bay, Newfoundland and Labrador, a town on Newfoundland's Bonavista Peninsula
 Hare Bay (Newfoundland and Labrador), a bay in the Great Northern Peninsula of Newfoundland